The following is a list of Rocky and Bullwinkle segments of the American animated television feature The Adventures of Rocky and Bullwinkle and Friends (1959–1964).  In the original broadcasts and later subsequent DVD releases, two Rocky and Bullwinkle “serial” segments were aired as part of each 23 minute program, which  consisted of several supporting features (including “Dudley-Do Right of the Mounties” “Aesop and Son” “Fractured Fairy Tales” “Peabody’s Improbable History” “Bullwinkle’s Corner” and “Mr. Know-it All”)  as well as bumpers.

Overview 
There is a difference of opinion regarding the titles famously used as teasers at the end of most Rocky and Bullwinkle segments to promote the next episode (e.g. "Don't miss tomorrow's exciting episode: Bullwinkle's Ride or Goodbye, Dollink"). Some sources, such as IMDb, use them as actual titles for the individual episodes. Others, however, regard them simply as each segment's final gag (most involve cultural references—sometimes rather obscure—and frequently dreadful puns) rather than as actual titles. While these titles are mentioned at the end of most episodes they never appear in or on the episodes to which they supposedly refer. NOTE: The episode titles used below are the titles used on title cards in syndicated versions. Indeed, while these titles invariably refer to the characters' predicament at the end of the segment, they often do not apply to anything that actually appears in the subsequent episode. The Rocky and Bullwinkle DVDs do not use these titles, referring to the individual segments simply by number. However, Keith Scott's The Moose that Roared, prepared in cooperation with Jay Ward's family and production company, does use them.

The first two seasons appeared on ABC as Rocky and His Friends. The last three seasons aired on NBC as The Bullwinkle Show. Today they are known collectively as The Rocky and Bullwinkle Show or simply Rocky and Bullwinkle. For legal reasons, current DVD editions title the reassembled programs The Adventures of Rocky and Bullwinkle and Friends.

Rocky and Bullwinkle story arcs generally end with the title characters riding off into the sunset. Rather than promoting a specific upcoming episode or story line the narrator simply exhorts viewers to "tune in next time" for the heroes' further adventures. Thus, the initial segment of each story arc is not named in the preceding episode; these episodes take their names from the story arc that they begin.

Season 1 (1959–60)

The first season contained 26 half-hour shows, each of which included 5 segments (making 130 segments in total.) Production of the first season was intentionally halted after twenty-six shows, as twenty-six weekly programs would fill exactly half a year and simplify any rerun schedule.

Jet Fuel Formula

The first story in the series is also the longest. Bullwinkle and Rocky are introduced when their cake recipe proves to be an excellent rocket propellant, but it draws the attention of two notorious spies (Boris and Natasha) as well as two alien beings from the Moon itself.

Box Top Robbery

The world's economy becomes so dependent on box top refunds that Boris and Natasha are able to cause worldwide sabotage via counterfeiting.

Season 2 (1960–61)

The second season contained 52 episodes and 260 segments, the most out of any of the five seasons. During this period the program was broadcast semiweekly.

Upsidaisium

Bullwinkle inherits a mine on Mount Flatten.  When he and Rocky go there, they find that Mount Flatten floats in the sky because it is the only source of upsidaisium, the anti-gravity metal.  Its value is such that Boris and Natasha's overlord, Mister Big, becomes personally involved in attempts to steal first the mountain and then the government's storehouse of ore.

Metal-Munching Mice

A legion of six-foot robot mice descend upon Earth and devour television reception antennas.

Greenpernt Oogle

The Brooklyn-accented ruler of a South Pacific island kidnaps Bullwinkle after the island's dominant bird disappears.

Rue Britannia

Boris is hired by three greedy brothers in London after their uncle bequeaths his mansion to Bullwinkle.

Buried Treasure

Boris masquerades as a US gangster and uses his new hirelings to rob Frostbite Falls' bank.

The Last Angry Moose
Bullwinkle, unimpressed by the acting talents of movie star March Marlow, is convinced he is a better actor and commissions a disguised Boris to make him a star—becoming an unintentional comic superstar.

Wailing Whale

Boris rampages through the sea with Maybe Dick, a giant robot whale.

Season 3 (1961–62)
Season 3 contained 33 episodes and 165 segments.

The Three Moosketeers
Bullwinkle's skills with Shish kebob lead him to be hired by the sole surviving Musketeer.

Lazy Jay Ranch
Rocky and Bullwinkle buy a suffering dude ranch that raises worms. Meanwhile, Boris and Natasha are trying to get rid of them so they can gain the mineral rights to the ranch.

Missouri Mish Mash
Rocky & Bullwinkle, Boris, Natasha, and Fearless Leader, and the Moonmen all become involved in the hunt for the powerful Kirward Derby

Topsy Turvy World
Boris causes the Earth to tilt so that the South Pole is switched to the Pacific.

Season 4 (1962–63)
Season 4 contained 19 episodes and 95 segments, the least out of all five seasons.

Painting Theft
Boris and Natasha rob a museum in Paris and hide their paintings on Bullwinkle's farm, until Bullwinkle splatters whitewash on the paintings and finds he can sell them to snooty art collectors.

The Guns of Abalone
In an unauthorized sequel to The Guns of Navarone, Boris and Natasha lay siege to the world via powerful cannons left behind on Abalone Island, 18 years after they were silenced in World War II.

The Treasure of Monte Zoom
Boris goes after a treasure hidden in a Minnesota lake.

Goof Gas Attack
Pottsylvania has developed a nerve gas that renders intelligent people helplessly foolish but doesn't affect Bullwinkle.

Banana Formula
Running out of ideas, Boris and Natasha stumble upon a new sound-suppressed explosive named "Hush-a-Boom", but lose the formula when they foolishly inscribe it on a banana that Bullwinkle promptly devours.

Season 5 (1963–64)
Season 5 contained 33 episodes and 165 segments, similar to season 3.

Bumbling Brothers Circus
The two join a travelling circus, with Bullwinkle as a lion tamer and Rocky as an elephant trainer. This sparks the ire of Boris (the previous lion tamer) who tries to ruin their acts.

Mucho Loma
The sleepy Spanish town of Mucho Loma is being terrorized by Zero, a loudmouth minstrel turned nighttime nuisance. After accidentally driving through a building, Rocky and Bullwinkle are tasked with capturing him.

Pottsylvania Creeper
Fearless Leader enters a man-eating plant in a Frostbite Falls flower contest and the plant spreads vast amounts of seeds that grow into an army of man-eating plants.

Moosylvania
Bullwinkle discovers the lost state of Moosylvania and goes to Washington DC to campaign for the land's inclusion in the US.

The Ruby Yacht
An Indian ruler seeks a boat encrusted with valuable jewels that Bullwinkle finds in a lake.

Bullwinkle's Testimonial Dinner
Bullwinkle's attempt to get his expensive suit cleaned for a dinner in his honor becomes a chase to a Chinese laundrette that fronts for illegal activities by Boris and Natasha.

The Weather Lady

A fortune telling machine in the form of a lady is used by Boris and Natasha for an illegal gambling boat.

Louse on 92nd Street
Bullwinkle witnesses a known gangster commit a crime and now must be guarded lest Boris, a fanatical admirer of the gangster, eliminate him.

Wossamotta U
A forlorn college football team discovers Bullwinkle's unstoppable abilities as a passer and it quickly swells into undefeated success and superstardom, drawing out sports gamblers Boris and Natasha as well as a Southern Revanchist. 

This episode is full of numerous editing errors and inconsistencies. Most famously, during the final game against Mud City, when the Narrator says, "in the next ten minutes, Wossomotta U replayed the enitre last two years of the Civil War!", The Scoreboard read W.U. - 0, M.C. - 7(This means the first Touchdown W.U. scored was forgotten during editing) When the final touchdown is made and Rocky declares, "Wossamotta wins!", based on the final score: Mud City - 7, Wossomotta U - 6, Wossomotta lost the game. Even the Narrator is incorrect when he says that Wossomotta U finished its season unbeaten. This is the only time when Boris and Natasha have defeated Rocky and Bullwinkle, but the episode still shows them losing. This also means that because Wossomotta U lost, all the bets that Boris placed on Mud City actually won and Fearless Leader betting the Pottsylvanian Treasury therefore won 500 times its entire contents, since the odds to beat Wossomotta U was 500 - 1 for the final game.

Moosylvania Saved
To draw needed resources for Pottsylvania, Fearless Leader tricks Bullwinkle and Rocky into getting foreign aid to Moosylvania he intends Boris and Natasha to steal.

Short film (2014)
A Rocky and Bullwinkle short titled Rocky and Bullwinkle also known as Another Fine Moose You've Gotten Me Into or The Man In The Iron Moose, made by DreamWorks Animation and directed by Gary Trousdale, was to be shown in theaters before Mr. Peabody & Sherman, which opened on March 7, 2014.  This plan was dropped, but the short was later released with the film on Blu-ray 3D.

Notes

There is conflict between several online sources regarding the division of the story arcs into seasons. The breakdown presented here is based on the following references:

The Complete Season 1 DVD set begins with Jet Fuel Formula and concludes with Box Top Robbery. 
Season 2 begins with Upsidaisium. The Complete Season 2 DVD set contains 52 episodes (or 260 segments), which would run through Wailing Whale. 
Season 3 begins with The Three Moosketeers. This is confirmed in Keith Scott's The Moose that Roared. The Complete Season 3 DVD set contains four story arcs.
Season 4 begins with Painting Theft.
According to Keith Scott, Season 5 (as well as a new numbering system for the episodes) began with Bumbling Brothers Circus.

The DVD sets and Keith Scott's book have been assembled with the participation of Jay Ward's family and of the current incarnation of Jay Ward Productions and are believed to be authoritative.

References

External links 
 At the IMDb: Rocky and His Friends and The Bullwinkle Show

 
Rocky and Bullwinkle